Head Against the Wall is a 1959 French drama film directed by Georges Franju which stars Pierre Brasseur, Paul Meurisse, Jean-Pierre Mocky, Anouk Aimée, and Charles Aznavour. Called The Keepers on its English release, the story follows an aimless young man who is institutionalized for defying his wealthy father, and in the process airs several questions about how society defines and treats mental illness.

Plot
François, motherless son of an influential lawyer, has no qualifications, and no job. To mix with rich and superficial friends, he has borrowed money that he cannot repay. In desperation, he breaks into his father's desk, steals his cash, and wantonly burns his legal documents. Rather than call in the police, with the connivance of a doctor, his father has him committed to an isolated psychiatric hospital in the country.

There, he discovers that many of the inmates are not seriously deranged, but that Dr Varmont, the head of the institution, is a man of rigid views. Two friends he makes are Lenoir, a criminal hiding from gangland revenge, and Heurtevent, a gentle epileptic. To his joy, on the first Sunday, he has a visitor: This is Stéphanie, a girl he met on his last night of freedom, who knows he is not insane and urges him to get a grip of his life. His father visits after he tells Dr Varmont he wants to be reconciled, but the meeting is a failure, and release seems remote. With Heurtevent, he breaks out, but when his friend collapses in an epileptic seizure, the two are re-captured. In despair, Heurtevent hangs himself.

As the hospital cemetery is outside the walls, François plans another escape during the funeral. Lenoir gives him an address in Paris where he can get a bed and a job. Making a successful getaway, he calls at the address to find it is an illegal gambling den. Unsure if that is a world he wants to be in, he goes unannounced to Stéphanie's room, where she welcomes him, and they spend the night together. In the morning, two plainclothes men call, to be told by Stéphanie she knows nothing of his whereabouts. As soon as they have gone, François slips out, and, caught by them on the stairs, is rushed back to the asylum.

Cast

Soundtrack

Decades after the film's original release, in February 2005, the French soundtrack record label Play Time released the soundtrack on compact disc, along with other soundtracks performed by Maurice Jarre. This also includes soundtracks from other Franju films, including Eyes Without a Face and Thérèse Desqueyroux.

Track listing

References

External links
 
 
 

1959 films
1959 drama films
1950s French-language films
Films directed by Georges Franju
Films scored by Maurice Jarre
French drama films
1950s French films